Cynthia Teniente-Matson is the 32nd and current president of San José State University and the former president of Texas A&M University–San Antonio. Born in San Antonio, Teniente-Matson spent her adolescence in California, studied at the University of Alaska Fairbanks, and studied and worked at the University of Alaska Anchorage. She then returned to California to work at California State University, Fresno, where she would later earn her doctorate before returning to San Antonio to accept a position as TAMU–San Antonio's president. As president, she has overseen the university's growth into a four-year college with its first freshman class in 2016, and she has made statements about expanding the university's resources and infrastructure, partnering with local businesses, and involving the surrounding community.

Early life and career 
Teniente was born in San Antonio, Texas, where she grew up on the city's South Side until moving to California at age 8. She worked as a grocery store bagger for her first job. For her secondary education, she moved to Alaska, where she would live for 25 years, first attending the University of Alaska Fairbanks, where she received a Bachelor of Arts in management from in 1989. In 1991, she began working various administrative roles for the University of Alaska Anchorage, earning a master's degree in business administration in 1998 and holding a position as its vice chancellor of administrative services until moving back to California in 2004. There, Teniente began working in 2004 as vice president for administration and chief financial officer for California State University, Fresno (Fresno State), as well as chairing "the Fresno State Association, the President’s Commission on Human Relations and Equity, and the CSU Risk Management Authority." In 2013, she received an EdD in Educational Leadership from Fresno State.

Teniente Matson serves on the board of the American Association of State Colleges and Universities and the Higher Education Resource Services.

TAMU San Antonio presidency 
In 2014, the board of regents of the Texas A&M University System hired Teniente-Matson as the president of the San Antonio campus, which was the first college campus to open in the historically-underserved area. She succeeded Maria Hernandez Ferrier, who oversaw the university's founding years, accreditation, and partnership with the local Toyota plant. Teniente-Matson's initial goals included similar campus research partnerships in locally-relevant areas such as water conservation or cybersecurity. By 2016, Teniente-Matson had overseen the university's transformation from a satellite campus to a four-year college with its first entering freshman class, as well as the university's designation as a Hispanic-serving institution.

Teniente-Matson has made statements to the press about the university's future. She supports adding bike paths, trains, and entertainment facilities near the campus, on land owned by Verano Land Group with future development going through community meetings as of 2019. Additional goals include a student union with a student financial literacy center, as well as more dorms and intercollegiate athletics. On the subject of establishing a university under a tightening state budget, she stated, "what makes us unique is looking very closely at the students that we serve [...] what’s unique about our own geography, and what’s unique about our students, and then how we can build on that," as well as emphasizing the responsibility of university presidents to advocate for the university in the legislature and to keep the university's community informed. 

In 2019, Teniente-Matson suggested to the superintendents of East Central, Edgewood, Harlandale, Somerset, South San Antonio, Southside, and Southwest Independent School Districts that they formally partner together to work towards common goals.

San José State University presidency 
On November 16, 2022, it was announced that Teniente-Matson would be departing TAMU-San Antonio to become the new president of San José State University. Teniente-Matson assumed the university presidency on January 16, 2023.

References 

Women heads of universities and colleges
People from San Antonio
California State University, Fresno alumni
University of Alaska Anchorage alumni
University of Alaska Fairbanks alumni
California State University, Fresno people
University of Alaska Anchorage people
Year of birth missing (living people)
Living people
Presidents of San Jose State University